The Chevrolet Step-Van, and its badge-engineered counterpart the GMC Value-Van, is a multi-stop truck made by General Motors from 1940 to 1999.

Dubl-Duti
The first generation of General Motors multi-stop delivery van was called the Dubl-Duti, introduced in 1940. The van was built on the  chassis of the Chevrolet pickup truck, with a body built by Divco Twin. The Dubl-Duti van used the same  "Thriftmaster" six-cylinder engine as the pickup and Chevrolet passenger cars, but with a single-barrel updraft Carter carburetor rather than the downdraft Rochester unit used in other Chevrolet trucks.

The Dubl-Duti was restyled in 1941 to suit the new Chevrolet AK Series truck body. Despite the "Advance Design" trucks being released in calendar year 1947 as a 1948 model, the AK Series-based Dubl-Duti continued production for another year thereafter.

A new generation of Dubl-Duti was introduced for model year 1949, with two different wheelbases shared with the medium-duty Advance Design pickup trucks: the model 3742 with  wheelbase, and  log model 3942 . The "Thriftmaster" engine was carried over for the 1949 and 1950 model years, and replaced for 1951 by the  "Loadmaster" engine. The Dubl-Duti ceased production in 1955.

Step-Van
In 1955 a new series of Chevrolet forward-control chassis launched, similar to the previous Dubl-Duti, available in three sizes:

 the 3542, with a  wheelbase able to accommodate a  body, and,
 the 3742, with a  wheelbase able to accommodate a  body

All models were available only with the "Loadmaster" six-cylinder engine, which was renamed the "Thriftmaster Special" in 1956. The "Special" appellation was used to distinguish the fact it still had a downdraft carburetor (as the Dubl-Duti vans before it had) and a positive crankcase ventilation system to prevent combustion gases from passing up into the cabin while the truck was slow-moving or stationary. (Most cars at the time relied on a draft tube to passively vent the crankcase gases to atmosphere when the vehicle was in motion, which was not feasible for the enclosed engine bay and anticipated use of the forward-control chassis for delivery vans.) The  Trademaster V8 engine was available as an option in 1956 and 1957.

The standard transmission was a column-shifted three-speed, but a floor-shifted four-speed was added as an option in 1951, and heavier-duty Borg-Warner three-speed and the Hydramatic automatic transmission were also available as options beginning in 1954.

Until 1958 GM only made the rolling forward-control chassis for other coachbuilders such as Boyertown, De Kalb, Dayton T. Brown, Olson, Alf-Herman, Universal and Montpelier to fit specialized van bodies to. Beginning in 1958 GM began selling their own steel bodies on their forward control chassis, and called the new vans Step-Van. The bodies were installed by the Union City Body Company, a GM subsidiary based in Union City, Indiana.

The Thriftmaster Special six-cylinder engine was discontinued in 1962 and replaced by the  High Torque 230 engine. The  High Torque 292 was available as an option in P20 and P30 beginning in 1964, and the  High Torque 250 became standard in the P20 and P30 in 1966, replacing the 230.

The first generation Step-Vans became known as the "round-front" after the "square-front" Step-Van King was introduced in 1964. Production of the older body (model codes P2545, P2645, P3545 and P3645) ceased in 1967.

Step-Van 7
A new shortened model called the "Step-Van 7"—also known by the P10-series chassis code—was introduced in 1961, so-named for its  body on a new  wheelbase.

Step-Van King

A new series of models with squared-off styling (P2535 and P3535) reminiscent of the Step-Van 7 was introduced in 1964.

The Step-Van King, referred to simply as the Step-Van after the Step-Van 7 ceased production in 1981, remained in production with a choice of either steel or aluminum bodywork until GM sold the Union City plant in 1999.

References

External links
 Chevrolet » Step-Van King '68
 I just bought this former USPS Chevy P30 step van, planning to convert it to a short term camper. What do you think?
 Chevy Forward Control Chassis
 Chevrolet Walk-In Vans And Trucks
 GMC P10 Van

Commercial vehicles
Chevrolet trucks